Gloria Bistrița may refer to:
CS Gloria Bistrița-Năsăud, a football club in Bistrița, Romania. 
CS Gloria Bistrița-Năsăud (handball), a women's handball club in Bistrița, Romania.
ACF Gloria Bistrița, a dissolved football club in Bistrița, Romania.